The tomtit (Petroica macrocephala) is a small passerine bird in the family Petroicidae, the Australasian robins. It is endemic to the islands of New Zealand, ranging across the main islands as well as several of the outlying islands. In Māori, the North Island Tomtit is known as miromiro and the South Island Tomtit is known as ngirungiru. This bird has several other Māori and English names as well. There are several subspecies showing considerable variation in plumage and size. The species is not threatened and has adapted to the changes made to New Zealand's biodiversity.

Etymology
The term tomtit was originally a shortened form of tom titmouse. Either form has been used to describe a number of small birds, but in England tomtit was most commonly used as an alternate name of the blue tit. The word tit is today used for a number of small birds, especially of the family Paridae. Originally, it was used for any small animal or object.

Taxonomy and evolution
The tomtit is one of four species of the genus Petroica found in New Zealand, the ancestors of which colonised from Australia. The species was once thought to have been descended from the scarlet robin, although more recent research has questioned this. It seems likely that there were two colonisation events, with the North Island robin and the South Island robin descended from one event, and the black robin and tomtit from another.

There are five subspecies of the tomtit, with each subspecies being restricted to one of the following islands or island groups: North Island, South Island, the Snares Islands, the Chatham Islands, and the Auckland Islands. Four of these five subspecies have been elevated to full species in the past (the Chatham subspecies was retained with the South Island tomtit), but genetic studies have shown that these subspecies diverged relatively recently.

North Island tomtit P. m. toitoi
South Island tomtit  P. m. macrocephala
Chatham tomtit P. m. chathamensis
Auckland tomtit P. m. marrineri
Snares tomtit P. m. dannefaerdi

Description

The tomtit is a small (13 cm, 11 g) bird with a large head and a short bill. The male North Island subspecies has black head, back, wings (with a white wing-bar), and a white belly. The subspecies from South Island, the Chatham Islands, and Auckland Islands are similar, but have a yellow band across the breast between the black head and white belly. The females are brown instead of black. The Snares Island subspecies is entirely black, and is known as the black tit.

The island subspecies of tomtits show a striking variation in body size, being considerably larger than their mainland relatives, a tendency known as the Foster's rule or the island effect. Birds from the main islands weigh around 11g, compared with birds from Snares Island, which weigh in at 20 g.

Behaviour

The tomtit is mostly an insectivore, feeding on small invertebrates, such as beetles, caterpillars, spiders, moths, wētā, earthworms, and flies. Fruit is taken during the winter and autumn. Most subspecies feed in vegetation, waiting on a perch and watching for prey. Insects are also gleaned from branches and leaves. The Snares subspecies feeds on the ground as well, in a similar fashion to the North or South Island robins.

See also

References

External links

 

Birds described in 1789
Taxa named by Johann Friedrich Gmelin
Endemic birds of New Zealand
Birds of the Chatham Islands
Petroica